Hargrave House was a historic home located near Statesville, Iredell County, North Carolina.  It was built about 1860, and is a two-story, three bay, Late Greek Revival style frame dwelling.  It features a two-story center bay portico supported by Doric order columns.  Also on the property is a contributing smokehouse.

It was added to the National Register of Historic Places in 1982.

References

Houses on the National Register of Historic Places in North Carolina
Greek Revival houses in North Carolina
Houses completed in 1860
Houses in Iredell County, North Carolina
National Register of Historic Places in Iredell County, North Carolina